Dulhipur is a census town in Chandauli district  in the state of Uttar Pradesh, India.

Demographics
 India census, Dulhipur had a population of 7,744. Males constitute 51% of the population and females 49%. Dulhipur has an average literacy rate of 34%, lower than the national average of 59.5%: male literacy is 42% and female literacy is 26%. In Dulhipur, 19% of the population was under 6 years of age.

References

Cities and towns in Chandauli district